The following is a list of South African university chancellors and vice-chancellors. In most cases, the chancellor is a ceremonial head, while the vice-chancellor is chief academic officer and chief executive.

Public universities

Private universities

See also
List of vice-chancellors and chancellors of the University of Pretoria
List of chancellors of the University of Cape Town

References

University chancellors and vice-chancellors
University
 List of South African university chancellors and vice-chancellors
South Africa
South Africa